John Klein is an Australian former professional rugby league footballer who played in the 1970s and 1980s who played for the Penrith Panthers.

Early life
John Klein was born in October 1952 in Blacktown. He played his junior football with Blacktown Workers Club before playing with Lalor Park in 1970 & 1971 as a member of that clubs winning under 19 and under 21 team in the Parramatta Junior Rugby League competition.

Career 
In 1972 he trialled and was graded with the Penrith Panthers in the Sydney competition player 17 games that season in the 3rd grade side coach by Tom Wilson.

In 1973 he was a member of Penrith's under 23's side which qualified for the play-offs side losing to Balmain Tigers in the eliminating semi final.

In 1974 Klein made his initial first grade appearance against North Sydney at Penrith Park losing 28–23 in a close encounter. Over the next four seasons he played a total of 30 games in the top side which was affected by injuries and a loss of form.

At the end of the 1977 season, Klein signed an agreement to Captain-coach Bathurst St Patricks in the Group 10 CRL competition with limited success. He played with St Pats for 3 seasons (1978–81) scoring over 60 tries for the club. Retiring halfway through the 1981 seasons due to injuries.

In 1983, he was transferred in his employment (State Bank) to Quirindi where he came out of retirement and played with "Grasshoppers" for 3 seasons (1983–85). He was appointed Captain-coach for the 1985 season.

In 1986, following another transfer in his employment to Sydney at the end of the '85 season, Klein played for 2 seasons with the Brothers club in the North Sydney competition winning the "A" grade division in 1986. Appointed Captain-coach for the 1987 season he was forced to retired midway through the season due to further injuries.

Klein is the father of NRL referee Ashley Klein.

References

External links
 Statistics at rugbyleagueproject.org

1952 births
Living people
Australian rugby league coaches
Australian rugby league players
Blacktown Workers players
Penrith Panthers players
Rugby league players from Sydney